Venkata Rajula Kandriga is a small village in Sathyavedu mandal, located in Chittoor district of Andhra Pradesh, India. As of 2020 its population is 1907. The total area of Venkatarajula Kandriga is 1297 hectares.

References 

Villages in Chittoor district